All-trans-zeta-carotene desaturase (Crtlb, phytoene desaturase (ambiguous), 2-step phytoene desaturase (ambiguous), two-step phytoene desaturase (ambiguous), CrtI (ambiguous)) is an enzyme with systematic name all-trans-zeta-carotene:acceptor oxidoreductase. This enzyme catalyses the following chemical reaction

 all-trans-zeta-carotene + 2 acceptor  all-trans-lycopene + 2 reduced acceptor (overall reaction)
 (1a) all-trans-zeta-carotene + acceptor  all-trans-neurosporene + reduced acceptor
 (1b) all-trans-neurosporene + acceptor  all-trans-lycopene + reduced acceptor

This enzyme is involved in carotenoid biosynthesis.

References

External links 
 

EC 1.3.99